Alibag is one of the 288 Vidhan Sabha (Assembly) constituencies of Maharashtra state in Western India.

Members of Legislative Assembly

Election results

General elections 2009

References

Assembly constituencies of Maharashtra
Politics of Raigad district